Saint-Maurice is a commune in the southeastern suburbs of Paris, France. The insane asylum Charenton was located in Saint-Maurice; it is now a psychiatric hospital.

History
Originally called Charenton-Saint-Maurice, the name of the commune was officially shortened to Saint-Maurice in 1842.

In 1929, the commune of Saint-Maurice lost half of its territory when the city of Paris annexed the Bois de Vincennes, a part of which belonged to Saint-Maurice.

Geography

Climate

Saint-Maurice has a oceanic climate (Köppen climate classification Cfb).

Population

Transport
Saint-Maurice is served by no station of the Paris Métro, RER, or suburban rail network. The closest station to Saint-Maurice is Charenton – Écoles station on Paris Métro Line 8. This station is located in the neighboring commune of Charenton-le-Pont,  from the town center of Saint-Maurice.

Education
Schools in the commune include four preschools (écoles maternelles): Ecole du Centre, Ecole Delacroix, Ecole de Gravelle, Ecole du Plateau, three elementary schools: Ecole du Centre, Ecole de Gravelle, and Annexe Roger Revet, and one junior high school, Collège Edmond Nocard.

Area senior high schools include Lycée Polyvalent Robert Schuman in Charenton-Le-Pont, Lycée Intercommunal Eugène Delacroix in Maisons-Alfort, and Lycée Marcelin Berthelot in Saint-Maur-des-Fossés.

Personalities
 Éric Assadourian, football player
 Evan Fournier, basketball player
 Hassan Yebda, football player
 Yves Niare, athlete
 Eugène Delacroix, romantic painter
 Adrien Rabiot, football player
 Donatien de Sade, writer

See also
 Communes of the Val-de-Marne department
 Französischer Dom

References

External links

 Home page 

Communes of Val-de-Marne